Madison High School is a secondary school in Madison, Nebraska, United States. It has a population of 566 students.

References

Public high schools in Nebraska
Schools in Madison County, Nebraska